René Razafiarison (born July 25, 1937 in Antananarivo) is a Malagasy politician. He is a member of the Senate of Madagascar for Analamanga, and is a member of the Parliamentary Alliance for the Development of Madagascar.

1937 births
Living people
Members of the Senate (Madagascar)

References